AEL Football Club, also known by its full name Athlitiki Enosi Larissas, simply called AEL or Larissa, is a Greek professional football club based in the city of Larissa, capital of Greece's Thessaly region.

Founded in 1964, it is directly associated with the city of Larissa and its representation. The club's emblem, is a rising horse and its colors are crimson and white. It is the only team outside the two major Greek cities (Athens and Thessaloniki) to have won the Greek Championship, which happened in the 1987–88 season. AEL has also won the Greek Cup twice (1984–85 and 2006–07) and came runners-up in the Cup finals of 1982 and 1984. This record places the club among the top teams in the history of Greek football.

They play their home games at Alcazar Stadium, the club's initial homeground that was renovated in the summer of 2020, with a capacity of 13,108 seats. The team competed in the Greek Super League, the first tier of the Greek football league system, until its relegation in May 2021.

History

Athletic Union of Larissa, The "Queen of Thessaly", the "Queen of the lowlands". AEL, is the club that represents one of the greatest Greek football prefectures. One Championship, two cups, four finals and many important successes at European level compose the temporal profile of the top team of the Greek region.

Creation and first years (1964–79)

AEL was created from a vision of a powerful team that will represent a city like Larissa in the top category. The 17 May 1964, is referred to as the exact date of its establishment, and then—after a barrage of meetings and discussions held at the Municipal Conservatory of Larissa and a catalytic last meeting of the local county clubs—it was decided the merger of Iraklis Larissa, "Aris", "Toxotis" and "Larissaikos". The Athletic Union of Larissa was now a reality, designed on the background of the Second Division, in shades of crimson and white, (not black and white, as initially decided).  Typically, the conversion of the statute of Iraklis Larissa just a few days later—on 22 May—and its adoption on 8 June, gave AEL status, while teams "Dimitra", "Doxa Emporoipalilon" (based on "Aris Larissas" and "Doxa"), "Pelasgiotida" (by "Larissaikos" and "Pelasgikos") and "Olympos" (based on "Toxotis" and "Panthessalikos") completed this football family. On 7 June, Alcazar Stadium, the team's first homeground, recorded the initial friendly game, against Panionios which, by that time, was a very strong team, winning 2–1. Yugoslavian Alexander Petrovic, was the first foreign coach that was hired to ensure the impartiality of the team lineup. Thus, names of players like Zampas, Karelias, Kyriakos, Lellis, Papazoglou, Kassas, Saltapidas, Delfos, Katsianis and many others, passed into the history of Thessalian football. Everything was ready to start, under the administrative umbrella of a 15-member ecumenical council, composed of representatives of clubs and organizations of the city, in which the property was held by the former president of Iraklis Larissa, K. Tzovaridis.

Examples of other Greek areas where mergers and establishment of strong teams brought direct impact and a promotion in the 1st Division, has created in advance an optimism which  did not materialize.  The team ended the 1964–65 season in fifth place. The next year, the team  improved by two seats in the final table. The promotion was lost in a game on 8 May 1966 at Megara with the home side Vyzas opponent. During the entry of the team on the field, player Dimitrios Zambas was hit in the head by a ladder thrown from the stands and was taken to the hospital. The team with 10 players due to the elimination of Kyriakidis from the first quarter,  and with three of the 10 remaining players injured, had formal presence, and was defeated 6–0). As well-known coaches like Dionysis Minardos, Giannis Helmis and Giourkas Seitaridis the first turned down the opportunity to steer the team, the downturn seemed certain and in 1969 their position fell even further.  Relegation would be inevitable if the political conditions of the time—Greek military junta of 1967–1974—and the fact that teams headed by powerful men were in the same predicament, brought changes in the status of Greek football. Therefore, Kostas Aslanidis, Lieutenant Colonel and the Secretary General of Athletics, increased the two groups of the Second Division to three and thus AEL, Chania and Ionikos continued in the B' National. There was a rationalization of the Second Division, by creating three groups of 16 teams, of which 15 would be relegated (five of each group) into the 3rd Division. Relegation did not happen and it was decided the next season that each group have 18 teams. Otherwise, like the previous season, the winners of groups (three this time) went to the final phase, which claimed the promotion in the 1st Division. The team indeed, with the entrance to the 1970s, the emergence of the administrative forefront of Kantonias family (the owner of BIOKARPET Group) and a dramatic changing at liveware, managed to change the status. The coming of some experienced players such as Simantiris, Kyziroglou, Charitidis and Nikiforakis framed the talented Lakis Pagkarliotas and the others.

25–06–1972 : It was the last game of the championship of the Second Division. AEL needed the victory to celebrate the promotion in the First National (the team had 95 points while opponent Panserraikos had 96 and only the first of the group would promote). In the Serres Municipal Stadium that day (which holds the all-time attendance record with 14,200 tickets) except the locals, also existed around 5000 guest fans from Larissa.
Nevertheless, AEL managed to precede with 0–1 but Panserraikos equalized with a disputed penalty.
Soon riots appeared between the players on the court and generalized at the end of the match between the fans (final result 1–1). The next day, thousands citizens of Larissa were gathered and resentful of the injustice marched to the central square of the city. The demonstration took the character of an anti-junta movement. One of the few mass events that were made in Greece before the events of Athens Polytechnic. Two days later AEL submitted an objection for the improper use of the player of Panserraikos Stefanidis. The Regulations Committee EPO upheld the complaint because Panserraikos did not pay the fine of 250 Drachmas for the penalty. On 30 June, the same committee in another meeting and after the intervention of Colonel Aslanidis (himself originating from Serres), dismissed the objection of AEL and promoted Panserraikos to the 1st National.

AEL lineup in that match:
Siavalas, Buttos, Simantiris, Kyziroglou, Lellis, (63' Makris), Nikiforakis, (50' Zachos), Charitidis, Argiroulis, Stergiadis, Seitaridis, Gkountelitsas..Εventually, what failed then to fulfil the team of Kostas Polychroniou, became reality one year later by the team of Stefan Karamfilovic.

The first promotion
A season that was started with President Antonios Kantonias, continued with Michalis Kittas and ended up headed by Mayor Messinis, was to be the top—until then—for the "crimsons" who rejoiced in the finale closing, the coveted promotion. It was the year that Horacio Morales (†), Daniel Hill, Giorgio Vajeho, Guillermo Daus and Enrique Cavoli flew from Argentina and "landed" at Alcazar. Just months earlier they had played with the colors of Independiente against AC Milan in the Intercontinental Cup. On 23 June 1973, AEL wins Kallithea 3–0 and seal typically the promotion in the First National, finishing first with 98 points, ahead of the second renaissance Karditsa who finished with 89 points. The goals for AEL succeed by Pagkarliotas at 16', D. Seitaridis at 38' and Charitidis at 80'. AEL lined up on the field with the following players: Siavalas, Simantiris, Seitaridis M., Hill, Kyziroglou, Boutos, Charitidis, Cavoli, Rakintzoglou, Seitaridis and Pagkarliotas.. The team started the season 1973–74 at the First National, with the enthusiasm of a rookie, but clearly capable of material, grafted by the talent and quality players like Kyriakidis, Matzourakis and Dramalis in order to stay in the category. The course was based on the overall strength of the home ground and the final 9th position was considered highly successful. Karamfilovic was replaced (due to expired residence to the country that was not renewed for political reasons), by the Bulgarian coach Ivan Kochev. However, a team built on legionnaires without first having obtained the financial strength and solid basis, couldn't have long term evolution. So, the very next year problems started, which led to hasty choices, judgments and frequent upheavals in all levels. Inevitably therefore, the team didn't avoided the relegation and on summer of '75 returned to the Second Division. Since an immediate return was considered impossible, the rebuilding of the team began slowly, mainly based in local Larissa's area players. More experienced Siavalas, Boutos, Lellis, Stergiadis, and Argiroulis formed the backbone on which, as time went on, had positive impact for the team. Of course, the great breakthrough was made a year later by President Elias Kelesidis and his colleagues in the administration, when they decided to promote to the first team all of the youth squad of AEL, and collect all the talents that admittedly stood well in the Thessalian prefecture. Thus, on 26 May 1977, in a friendly match against AEK (the first under spotlights in Alcazar stadium), AEL lined up with Anagnostou, Giannis Mousouris and nine native players from Larissa's region. Among them, unknown then, Takis Parafestas, Giannis Valaoras, Dimitris Koukoulitsios and Christos Andreoudis. That summer of 77, rookies including Dimitris Mousiaris and Giannis Valaoras signed a professional contract.  These two, along with Koukoulitsios and Ilias Selionis, became members of the youth National teams.
On 18 June 1978 AEL traveled in Thessaloniki, and celebrated on the pitch of Nea Efkarpia a great victory against Macedonikos (4–1), finishing first with 59 points ahead of Olympiakos Volos, who eventually collected 57 points, while ensured the return in the major league of Greek football as the champion of the Northern Group of Second Division. Koukoulitsios scored the goals for AEL at 17' and 60', Valaoras at 31' and Liapis at 87'. AEL lined up on the field with the following players: Bountolos, Parafestas, Selionis, Dramalis, Argiroulis, Koumarias (63' Koukoulitsios), Andreoudis, Liapis, Mousiaris, Valaoras (61' Rammos).. The period 1977–78, completed the work of the previous season when AEL had finished in third place with 46 points. The balanced combination of experienced and talented players managed to create a strong team that succeeded in gaining the promotion. AEL returned to the First National and now, the solid foundations on which founded this football building, guaranteed a 15-year establishment and recognition that followed.

1980s: the Golden Decade
The successful policy of carefully selected few experienced and many talented young players continued and AEL not only threatened, but started slowly building a bright future, often achieving results that showed that something big was coming up. However, the same policy maintained by all administrations in the 80s, with proper and prudent management of its human material, gradually cultivated by coaches like Yugoslavian Milan Ribar, and later Kostas Polychroniou and Antonis Georgiadis. Even though some players selectively exited the team, it was certain that there was an equal replacement. So while the team has changed almost everything from the beginning to the end of the decade, in the conscience of the fans it has remained as one and single season. It was the era of AEL or better AEL FC, since in the summer of 1979 it was decided the organization of Greek football on a professional basis. The late Antonios Kantonias, raising the prestige and power of the group "BIOKARPET" was the one who managed to secure the independence of the club, with exemplary organization and a very clear strategy : The aim to reach to the top. Healthy reasons did not allowed him to continue as President of the Interim Committee and the chair of the first administration, and was finally replaced by Simos Palaiochorlidis. But he had already managed to complete his mission.

Grieving for young talents
On 6 September 1979, Dimitris Koukoulitsios and Dimitris Mousiaris, were killed in a car crash near Thiva, on their way to Athens for a training with the U-21 National team.  Giannis Valaoras, who had survived the accident and overcame the shock, has been one of the greatest members of the team of the 80s.

The "Small Hamburg": 1981–82 Greek Cup finalists, 1982–83 Greek League runners-up

With a stable administration, new faces on the roster, Maloumidis, Galitsios, Golandas and gradually Voutyritsas and Mitsibonas and with the advent of the technical leadership of Antonis Georgiadis, AEL was beginning to show its "teeth".
Best Regional team for the 1980–81 season, AEL claimed the European exit in the final league game. Participation in the Greek Cup final in the summer of '82, for the first time in its history, and a 1–0 defeat by Panathinaikos in the Nea Philadelfeia stadium. The "greens" succeeded to the finals before the end of the championship and the barrage against Olympiakos, in the neutral Volos, having the certainty that it would provide them in advance the Cup.  On that historic first final that was held on 19 June 1982, AEL lined up with the following players: Plitsis, Parafestas, Patsiavouras, Galitsios, Argiroulis, Dramalis (82' Voutyritsas) Maloumidis, Golantas, Koutas (82' Mitsibonas) Andreoudis, Valaoras.  The next season (1982–83) they came to claim the title after a great victory in the second round at the Karaiskaki Stadium derby against Olympiakos. Eventually, the second place constituted the ultimate fulfillment for Jacek Gmoch's players, who had been under strong denial because of the modest beginning of the team in the first round of the championship.

1983–84 Greek Cup finalists
The legacy left by that season in living material, was a defender named Giorgos Mitsibonas, one forward in the person of Michalis Ziogas, (a player who knew as much as anyone else to be at the right time and in the right place) and of course a "coach on the field", which was none other than the Polish international, Kazimierz Kmiecik.
The team of '82–83 season yielded modern, fast and sophisticated football and fairly won the nickname "Small Hamburg", taken by the great German team of the 80s. The first exit in Europe was a rewarding and meaningful vindication of an effort that lasted several years, even though AEL ultimately failed to overcome the obstacle of the very strong Hungarian Honvéd.

Austrian coach Walter Skocik had found a good, technical but somewhat tired team. And even if they didn't show steady progress in the league, they managed to be in another Cup Final. Opponent on 6 June 1984, Panathinaikos again, this time in the Athens Olympic Stadium, which was also used by the "greens" as home ground. This fact, coupled with the modest appearance of AEL, apparently justified by the intensity of the semi-final battle against Iraklis, (which took place just three days earlier) and the loss of the suspended Valaoras, brought normal|y a 2–0 defeat, leaving AEL bitterness, which diminished by the ticket for the UEFA Cup Winners' Cup, once Panathinaikos had won the double.
The next season, president Kostas Samaras and coach Andrzej Strejlau (who brought with him from Poland another great player, named Krzysztof Adamczyk), were very optimistic about the team's course. Indeed, its participation in the Cup Winners' Cup for the period 1984–85 was impressive and established the name of the Thessalian team in the European football map. The "crimsons" came up to the "8", where they have been excluded after two sensational quarter-finals by the Soviets of Dynamo Moscow. The unique, however, distinguish in the institution of the Cup Winners Cup that season, made a big impression and showed how great this team was and capable for even bigger achievements. This team however—that many believed was playing the best football in Greece by that time—was unstoppable and determined to finally overcome and get to a title. This title was not the championship, (although succeeded a record for best offensive productivity in the season), but the Greek Cup, the final of which AEL qualified for the third time.

1984–85 Greek Cup winners

The final against the 1985 champion PAOK, has been recorded as one of the top performances in the history of AEL. The "crimsons" played "total" football, smashed with 4–1 their opponents and eventually came to their first title. However, in the pregame of that fight a common point united the two teams...AEL and PAOK lined up before the referee Makis Germanakos without their two key players (left back Nikos Patsiavouras and top scorer Christos Dimopoulos), since they both had already agreed to sign for Panathinaikos! As for the actual game, on 22 June 1985, on the Athens Olympic Stadium before 30,000 shared fans, AEL seemed to have the upper hand from the start, but completely dominated from the 19', when Vassilakos was expelled by direct red card (hit Adamczyk off-phase) and reached its first goal at 39' with Ziogas, after an incredible attempt of the Polish striker. After the second half κick-off Kmiecik wrote with perfect shot the 2–0 and although PAOK reduced to 55' with Skartados, Andrzej Strejlau's players finished the game at 73' with Ziogas and 75' with Valaoras, teaching modern football while creating a host of missed opportunities. The players who led AEL in its first title in its history were: Plitsis, Parafestas, Kolomitrousis, Galitsios, Mitsibonas, Voutiritsas, Ziogas, Kmiecik, Adamczyk, Andreoudis (87' Tsiolis) Valaoras.
The first trophy that was raised to the sky of Athens the previous evening by the team captain Takis Parafestas entered the city the next day escorted by hundreds of cars.

Ambitious battles were waiting for AEL in Europe, but failed to proceed, against the famous Italian Sampdoria. Maybe tired, perhaps it still cost them so much the leaving of their "conductor", the beloved Kazio for the Stuttgart Kickers... His compatriot Janusz Kupcewicz, who replaced him, although came right from the best lineup of the 1982 FIFA World Cup in Spain, had injury problems and did not help as much as he could..At that time, the culmination of a transfer thriller, a player who was acquired by Toxotis Larissa and dressed in crimson, making his first professional steps and later called "the magician", Vassilis Karapialis. His own introduction, along with two to three other important events, painted the following year, the most indifferent season for AEL that decade. The assumption of command by Stelios Kantonias and the return of Jacek Gmoch in the technical leadership, were guarantees for the great offensive of the new season. No paint, but it was stronger than the black of mourning, which darkened the sky of Larissa. 19 years old Vasilis Theodoridis, a PAOK supporter, an hour before the match hurled a fishing flare against the local fans stands which hit the unsuspecting Charalambos Blionas in the carotid arteries. The unfortunate professor died seconds later. That day, on 26 October 1986, a grievous page was written in the history of Greek football and as though nothing is more important than the loss of a life, unequivocally just one year later, the city of Larissa has experienced glorious times. The only team in the Greek region who ever sat on the throne.

The "Miracle of 1988": Greek champions

he non-renewal of contracts of Parafestas and Andreoudis in the summer and the transfer of Plitsis to Olympiakos in December, were options that were not accepted by the fans, but the success of the team in conjunction with the "rising star" of Karapialis, minimized any opposition disposal. Especially when on 16 March 1988 the sports court announced the decision to remove 4 points from AEL because of the famous "doping case" of the Bulgarian striker (with very little participation in the championship), Georgi Tsingov. He was tested positive on the use of the substance Codeine, which is not likely to improve the performance of an athlete at all.. Conspiracy theories quoted around about what really happened, the player claimed that had a flu, others that it was a sabotage. Nevertheless, the whole city of Larissa rose up and in no time created road blocks that cut Greece in two, claiming the right of what the team had won over the football field. The barricades on the national highway lasted 5 whole days until an intervention by the political leadership of sports. They took the decision to restore order, and change the article in question. From 21 March 1988, teams ceased to be considered responsible for each possible doping athlete. AEL however, was largely responsible for the... psychological doping of the fans, which then helped to overcome doubt and anxiety and get proudly in the 87th minute of the penultimate game of the season against Iraklis, when that incredible shot of Mitsibonas hurled into space the enthusiasm of the crowd. So far, AEL is the first and only regional team that won the Greek championship.

Countdown and "Stone Years" (1996–2003)
Somewhere there the countdown began ...AEL was knocked hill, reached the top and had to start to go downhill...The circle of a large team had closed. Maybe if Xamax had not turned the match at Neuchâtel and not sent by 2–1 in the overtime and the unlucky for the "crimsons" penalty shootout, Champions League would held the name of AEL in its ledger, where reigns the amazing goal of Karapialis which opened the score on the second leg of Switzerland. This was the last presence for AEL in the most prestigious club competition in European football. The fans still believed that the team could stay in the spotlight. The accident was for those who were blurred by the excitement of the moment, and believed that the team could climb even higher and soon demanded the change of ownership. From there, players leaving and coming, administrations changed without programming, independently on the intentions of everyone.. The fact is that AEL gradually lost its credibility inside and outside stadiums and inevitably led eight years later, in May 1996, to the relegation which was spared in 1991, thanks to the amazing second round course. More generally, although great players such as late Lefter Millos, also unjustly shed, Ştefan Stoica, Paulo Da Silva, David Embé and Vangelis Tsoukalis, wore the shirt and tried to give the team its lost glory, failed nothing more than some effects—flickering, in a prescribed downward spiral that culminated with the painful return to the Second Division after 18 years.

Worst of all, however, occurred on 13 September 1997, when the "eagle stopped flying". Giorgos Mitsibonas, the player-symbol of the team, the gifted and talented figure that marked a glorious era, was killed in a car accident, near the village of Giannouli, 2 km outside of Larissa. He was 35 and left behind his wife and two young daughters. Even if he was not by that time an active player of the team, (he was playing in Tirnavos), the whole city said farewell along with him, to a large part of its passion for distinction and victory. The conscientious efforts of local factors to keep the club standing were unsuccessful, the debts piled in between, and no one was able by this time, in the summer of 2001, to save the team... AEL fell for the first time in its history in the Third Division, and even threatened with disintegration, with relegation to the Regional Championship, and had to get to the bottom to lift its head again, taking advantage of the beneficial law of special clearance...

Flirting with the 4th national

Summer of 2002 : AEL arrives at the worst point in its history. Playing again in the third national, almost without administration and money. The team's preparation for the new season was held in the local Alcazar Park (a place with rustic picnic areas, benches and trails, totally unsuitable for professional football training), near the city of Larissa. The first game was held on 25 August 2002 in Kalochori, Thessaloniki, against the local side ILTEX Lykoi. It was the 84th minute of the match, when the 2nd Assistant referee fell down after he was hit in the back, by an object that was thrown from the stands of the guest fans and was taken to the hospital. He claimed that he was unable to continue and the game never finished (The result was 1–1). The team was penalized with −3 points in the league table.. Amateur players and volunteers were called to offer their services.. The course was naturally very poor and the team risked with the relegation to the 4th National.. Halfway through the season appeared on the scene the name of Nikos Sotiroulis, a local businessman who by that time was the club's one and only sponsor. Along with the unforgettable friend, the late Giorgos Katsogiannis and supporting factors of Amateur AEL predominantly Elias Fasoulas and Zissis Helidonis, he fought the first negative judgments and vindicated, when on 8 March 2003 he became the owner of the team with a cost of 116,000 euros in an auction that was held the previous day and in which he was the only candidate! The club a year later, was renamed to AEL 1964 FC (under the special conditions imposed by the law of special clearance) and celebrated its return to the second division. Some months before, on 1 June 2003, the team survived the relegation in the Fourth National and thereby dissolve, in the last game of the championship against Niki Volos, winning 1–0. Although the most crucial and exciting match in the team's history was the one before, that was held in Chania, where the "crimsons" tie 3–3 and stayed alive, condemning the hosts. The new period started then vigorously and with one and only target, the promotion, which was achieved after an exhausting marathon of 38 games...On 30 May 2004, at Alcazar, AEL sealed the second place and the ticket to the higher category (which was virtually and "ironically" ensured by the victory from 1–0 at ILTEX Lykoi just a week before, in the same ground and almost two years after the incident with the Assistant referee), crashing with 5–1 the already "doomed" Pontiakos Nea Santa, while the chant "We are coming back" was rocking the crowded stadium... Coached by Takis Parafestas, with players such as Katsaras, Ziagkas, Kyparissis, Kehagias, Theodosiadis, Kontodimos, Lazorik, Paleologos, and a new upsurge of the fans that followed everywhere, the team persuaded that was really coming back . The one who left, and was the initiator and founder of this effort was Nikos Sotiroulis, who after a few days in mid-June 2004, gave way to the new owner and chairman Kostas Piladakis. A new era had begun.

New Age (2004–13): Piladakis years

And because a "good day seems from the morning", new management, technical leadership headed by Giorgos Donis, players like the effective striker Thomas Kyparissis and the presence of supporters that caused admiration through Greece, led AEL back again in the Super League, after nine years of absence. The 19 transfers that were made in the summer of 2004 radically changed the composition of the workforce and the equally young and ambitious coach had time to give the team the required homogeneity. The moderate so start treated by all with patience and maturity, and the proper corrections that were made in January, found AEL "galloping" from success to success. The conquest of the first place with 58 points was the natural consequence of this team effort and the fans celebrated the return in the Super League after 9 "stone" years, for almost 10 days! Starting from Sunday 15, of May 2005, in Kastoria, (1–1) in front of 4000 fans who accompanied the team's bus when returning, a car convoy of 5 km in length and a midnight party at Alcazar, to Wednesday 25, and the fiesta that was set up to the stadium for winning the title after beating Proodeftiki (3–1). Except Kyparissis, Papakostas, Ziagkas, Paleologos, Floros and Grigoriou, who continued from the previous season, players such as Christopoulos, Kipouros, the late Bahramis, Gikas, Stournaras, Föerster, Katsiaros, Digozis, Tsiatsios, Makris, Abouna, Nedeljković, Sisic, Passios, Chatziliontas, Galitsios and others, came to add their names to important pages in the team's history. Indeed, beside them, stood from summer until December 2004 the first Greek active scorer Alexis Alexandris and a well-known name in European football, the Romanian international midfielder Dennis Şerban, who played in many major teams, top of which was the Spanish Valencia. That same season, while in the 2nd Division, AEL reached to the "8" of the Greek Cup, having ruled in turn Acharnaikos, Apollon Athens, and Chalkidona of the First Division, before being excluded from the "European" Skoda Xanthi, which nevertheless beat 1–0 in the first match of Alcazar, turning the rematch in real derby. It was the forerunner of the great return.

In the elite: Greek Cup winners and European competition
In the first year after its return to the big category AEL did the "bang" bringing in the summer of 2005 directly from the English courts the UEFA Euro 2004 champion and former captain of the Greece national football team, Nikos Dabizas. A move that was made to shield the defense while sending the message that AEL did not return to Super League just to remain, but to star. Along with AEL returned also its supporters, giving impressive "presence" with tours admired throughout Greece. Toumba, Kaftanzoglio, Pankritio, Kleanthis Vikelidis, Zosimades...Comfortably stayed 8th, and a European opportunity occurred through Intertoto Cup, exploiting the weakness of PAOK to fulfill the criteria of UEFA. A European return, with two games against the Turkish Kayserispor did not bring the coveted Cup Qualification to UEFA Cup (within 0–0 draw, and a 2–0 defeat in Kayseri), but it was clearly an omen of a great European return, which was meant to be completed one year later. The 2006–07 season was one of its most successful, but also one of the most controversial in the club's modern history. On the one AEL rose again to the throne of Greek Cup Winners, and on the other flirted with relegation, eventually managing to secure salvation in the last matchday.

2006–07 Greek Cup winners

5 May 2007 is now a new landmark in the history of AEL 1964. Giorgos Donis and his players brought the Cup "again in Pineios" after 22 years, creating a new benchmark in the glorious march of the team. This is the final certificate that AEL returned to the elite of Greek football. Cup in 1985, the 1988 Championship, and a Cup again in 2007 in Volos where the game's MVP Nikos Dabizas and the vice captain, Zissis Ziagkas lifted together the third major trophy in the team's history. Opponents again Panathinaikos for the third time in a cup final where the "crimsons" prevailed with 1–2. The match was held in the Panthessaliko Stadium, inside Thessalian "territory". AEL secured beside all other the European participation for the second consecutive year, this time in the UEFA Cup. Jozef Kožlej and Henry Antchouet, took the baton from Ziogas, Kmiecik and Valaoras, signing with their own goals (who had the stamp of Giorgos Fotakis) this new "golden" page. The Slovakian striker opened the scoring in just the third minute with a perfect header following a free kick from Fotakis, Papadopoulos equalized with a penalty won by Föerster and masterfully executed in the 44th, however, Antchouet was the player who held the final. In the 83rd minute the "Gabonese Arrow" poured on the offensive after the exemplary deep ball of Fotakis and "thundered" the goalkeeper Ebéde, writing the 1–2 that was meant to be the final score. The final whistle of Kyros Vassaras found over 10,000 fans of the team ecstatically singing "because we have lost our minds, this Cup is ours", giving rise to frantic celebration. The celebration began at Panthessaliko from the awarding of the trophy, continued to Alcazar which opened its gates to welcome the winners and ended in the Central Square of Larissa shortly after midnight.

AEL 1964 (Donis): Kotsolis, Galitsios, Venetidis, Dabizas, Föerster, Bassila, Silva Cleyton (85 ' Vallas) Digozis, Aloneftis (74 ' Kalantzis), Fotakis, Kožlej, (60 'Antchouet).

Panathinaikos (Muñoz): Ebéde, Vyntra, Nilsson, (84 ' Šerić), Goumas, Morris, Leontiou, Tziolis (85 ' Bišćan), Ninis (73 ' Romero), Ivanschitz, Papadopoulos, Mantzios.

A week later the "crimsons" made the trip from Heaven to Hell and Heaven again within a 90-minute to ensure in the 81st minute with an Own goal the victory in Kalamaria with 2–1 against the local Apollon, having at their side to support over 3000 fans and putting "happy endings" in a difficult and successful year.

European dream

The new season started with the best omens. AEL as the Cup Winner, represented Greece in the UEFA Cup and the draw brought its technical leader, Giorgos Donis, faced with the club in which he started his international football career, English Blackburn Rovers. AEL entered the first qualifying round as the clear underdog, but on the afternoon of 20 September 2007 at the Panthessaliko Stadium—after Alcazar did not comply to the UEFA specifications—radically subverted the data: won 2–0 in the first match and lost 2–1 in the second game of Ewood Park and took a proud qualification to the group stage. In the "32" AEL faced powerful teams like Everton with a long tradition in the Premier League, rising Dutch AZ Alkmaar, German Nürnberg and the subsequent 2008 UEFA Cup winners mighty Russian Zenit Saint Petersburg. The team failed to pick a point in the four games, but won the respect that was confirmed by great European coaches, which AEL found opposite in this journey as Louis van Gaal and Dick Advocaat. Liberated from the burden of European obligations and with the assistance of world class players like Maciej Żurawski and Tümer Metin—AEL made an excellent championship course in the second round of the Super League and lost by one goal tie with Panionios the 5th position that led to the playoffs. A bittersweet epilogue to one of the most successful season in the team's history. Confirming the ever upward steps at all levels AEL recorded in 2008–09 one of the most successful years in its modern history. Stayed for 13 consecutive undefeated matches, finished fifth in the Super League and ensured its entry into the play-offs and a European output (in the UEFA Europa League) for the third time in the last four years and for just the third time in its history through the championship. It is a year in which AEL—among other things—broke two traditions winning in Kaftanzoglio Iraklis for the first time since 1982 and Olympiacos in Karaiskakis Stadium after 26 years.

New bending

From that point the countdown started again, which two years later brought back AEL in the second division. Wrong assessments and decisions regarding the completion of the team roster, and the leaving of the players who provided the guarantee of a remarkable and steady racing body, but much more decisive was the relentless chase of the team on the part of arbitration.
The European exclusion from the weak Icelandic KR Reykjavík
because of, mainly, the poor squad and preparation in the summer of 2009 brought the first clouds. The unexpected death of the late Mexican striker Antonio de Nigris on 16 November marked with indelible black lettering that period, in which AEL has managed to keep its position in the penultimate game of the season, changing coach (Giannis Papakostas in place of Marinos Ouzounidis) and achieving 5 wins in the last 7 games of the season. The prospect of the entry into the new stadium (the AEL FC Arena) and the feeling that the near-mishap last season had taught a lesson, created expectations of great things for the 2010–11 season, accompanied by large investments in player transfers. The transition from the historic Alcazar Stadium into the newly built AEL FC Arena in late November—early December 2010, was not made in the way that every fan had hoped and dreamed of. Two defeats by Panionios, (0–1) and PAOK (1–2), spoiled the festive atmosphere, but above all it was the shadow of arbitration that created a bleak future again. Grossly injusticed over the first half of the season (for nearly 13 games!) with catalytic decisions that shaped scores and results, AEL had an unequal fight until the end—changing coaching and trying to strengthen the squad but finally relented. Even the most pessimistic would hardly imagine at the beginning of that year that AEL in a new stadium and with star-players (Dabizas, Venetidis, Cousin, Canobbio, Metin, Tavlaridis Čontofalský, Pancrate) would finish in the penultimate position and eventually relegate. But the harsh reality was obliging the "crimsons" in a new Calvary, for which they were not themselves responsible, at least not entirely. The revelation of the match fixing scandal that occurred in the early summer of 2011 was only moral justification for the club and nothing more. After a barrage of outright decisions and scandalous implementation of sports legislation by the "Professional Sports Committee" and the Hellenic Football Federation, with selective application of regulations that was completed after almost six months(!) in October, the club remained in the Football League.

Today
After the club's relegation and a final attempt to vindicate without much effort, Piladakis began building the team that would return immediately in the Super League. He hired the experienced and reputable coach in the English grounds Chris Coleman and along with him players of International range like Zequinha, the famous Portuguese midfielder Luís Boa Morte, the Brazilian winger Césinha and many others. The course of the team in the 2011–12 season started with the best omens, but soon all would be reversed. Financial problems that piled, appeared again and eventually led the coach and many of the players to the exit. Rupture between the owner and the organized fans substantially undermined the future of the team. Piladakis resigned and the club without any administration and financial support, deliberately relegated in the 3rd Division. A move that is used by many football teams in Greece and was based in a financial law (special clearance), made to ensure the deletion of the previous debts, as teams that competing in the 3rd Category are considered amateur. In the summer of 2013, Evangelos Plexidas, a local businessman from Trikala took over and promised immediate return. Although the team indeed promoted relatively easily from the 3rd category and also won the Greek 3rd Category Cup, and the 2013–14 Amateurs' Super Cup many incorrect choices about the team's administration and management were not accepted by the fans. The changing of 6 coaches in a single season (2014–15) and the leaving of almost 15 players (although the team managed to participate in the Football League Play-Offs but failed to promote), created again a poor situation that led the major shareholder in the decision to sell the majority stake of his shares to Alexis Kougias, a well-known Greek lawyer and football administrator in July 2015. A year later, on 15 May 2016, the team finally gained the promotion into the Super League. In clear contrast with the last time, however, there was little enthusiasm among the fans, as Kougias had longtime conflicts with them as well as the local community and veterans of the team. The first season back in top flight was a difficult one, with 3 managers employed : Sakis Tsiolis left almost immediately after the club's promotion on June 2, 2016 only to return five months later and replace Angelos Anastasiadis who took over after him the previous summer. He managed to keep his place on the bench until March 21, 2017 when he resigned for personal reasons. Thus, despite relative financial stability the team struggled on and off the pitch, yet managed to keep its top flight status by finishing 13th, just above the relegation places. After one match coached by caretaker Theodoros Voutiritsas, Alexis Kougias hired the Dutch André Paus, that managed to stay for seven games in the club's bench. On September 14, 2017, Belgian manager Jacky Mathijssen was announced and signed for the rest of the season. Despite that, 11 Days later and after only three games (0–0 home draw with Atromitos a 4–1 away loss against Panionios and a 2–0 loss against Panathinaikos for the Greek Cup) he was fired. Ilias Fyntanis, the club's previous assistant coach returned as a caretaker and Kougias hired the 3rd manager for the ongoing season, Apostolos Mantzios. A day later, Mantzios announced that due to serious personal reasons he cannot take over. Ilias Fyntanis took over as the club's manager, and succeeded to make the team showing a more stable performance. Despite that, on February 20, 2018, he was fired once again and was replaced by the Serbian Ratko Dostanić that had coached the team in the season 2015–16 in the Football League. Ηowever, this new deal did not last for long. In Fact, only three games later, Dostanić resigned after a serious disagreement with the club's owner. Kougias hired the 42-year-old Sotiris Antoniou, himself originating from Agia, Larissa. He made his Super League managerial debut on April 1, 2018 on a 3–0 away defeat against Apollon Smyrnis. The team showed little improvement in the league but still avoided relegation relatively easily. They were also very close to qualification for the club's fifth cup final, but a last-minute goal for semifinal opponents AEK Athens send them through instead on the away goals rule.

Honours

Domestic
Super League (ex–Alpha Ethniki)
Winners (1): 1987–88
Runners-Up (1): 1982–83
Greek Cup
Winners (2): 1984–85, 2006–07
Runners-Up (2): 1981–82, 1983–84
Greek Super Cup
Runners-Up (2): 1988, 2007
Football League (ex–Beta Ethniki)
Winners (4): 1972–73, 1977–78, 2004–05, 2015–16
Runners-Up (2): 1971–72, 2014–15
Gamma Ethniki
Winners (1): 2013–14
Runners-Up (1): 2003–04
Gamma Ethniki Cup
Winners (1): 2013–14
Amateurs' Super Cup
Winners (1): 2013–14

International
 UEFA Cup Winners' Cup
 Quarter-finals (1): 1984–85

Crest and colours

Crest evolution
The emblem of the club is a wild rising horse (same as the symbol of the city), believed to be an ancient thessalian-breed horse like Alexander the Great's Bucephalus.

Colours and kit evolution
The team's colours have been crimson and white since the formation of the club in 1964.

First

Alternative

Facilities

Stadium

AEL FC Arena was the home ground of AEL until July 2020. It is a UEFA 3-star rated stadium and has a seating capacity of 16,118 all covered.  As well as functioning as a football stadium, Arena also operates as a conference centre and music venue. Actual construction of the stadium lasted 14 months, beginning in September 2009 and ended in late November 2010. From May 2013 until September 2015, the team played its home games in the old Alcazar Stadium, due to economic disputes concerning the rent of the stadium between the owning company (Gipedo Larissa AE) and the precedent chairman, Evangelos Plexidas. On 22 July 2015, the club's new major shareholder Alexis Kougias promised in an interview that the team will return and compete for the season 2015–16 in the Arena. Indeed, on 26 August 2015, there was an agreement and an official announcement of the new season's tickets for the stadium. The team competed in AEL FC Arena for five years, (until July 2020) when new financial disagreements and tensions arose, this time between Kougias and the owning company of the stadium. This led to the team leaving  AEL FC Arena once again and returning to a fully renovated Alkazar that is scheduled to host the club's games for the next two seasons.

Training facilities
AEL has its own training facilities in the area of the village Dendra, near to the town of Tyrnavos. Those facilities cover over 30,000 square meters, have multisport purposes for all of the team's athletes and among the others include:
Three football fields (one used by the first team, with 1,500 seats capacity and one for the U21 team's official matches)
One football field with artificial turf
Hosting area for the First and Reserves teams
Gym
Saunas
Rooms for tactical purposes
Press room
Changing rooms
Offices
Parking services

Supporters

Monsters is the largest AEL FC supporters club. The first attempt to organise the team's supporters was made on 31 March 1982 during the game against Diagoras 30 fans that belonged to the older but old-fashioned club Ierolochites gathered in the Gate D of the old Alcazar Stadium that was meant to be the legendary Gate-1 afterwards. Monsters club was formed as an idea of having a true and passionate support to the team without restrictions or boundaries.

The fans tend to use various styles and sizes of banners and flags bearing the name and symbols of their club and have been following the team since the first day everywhere in Greece and Europe.

Monsters have a strong relationship with German team 1. FC Nürnberg's supporter's club called Ultras Nürnberg 1994 or just UN-94. Fans of both clubs often lift banners and create choreography in support of the fellow teams.

S.F. Alkazar (Greek: Σύνδεσμος Φιλάθλων Αλκαζάρ) is the second biggest club of AEL supporters.

Records
 Most Appearances:  Giannis Galitsios (399)
 Most Goals:  Giannis Valaoras (73)
 Biggest Home Win: AEL 8–2 Kavala (1981–82)
 Biggest Away Win: Veria 2–5 AEL (1987–88)
 Most Wins in a Season: 18 (1982–83, 1987–88)
 Most Points in a Season: 50 (2008–09)
 Record Home Attendance: AEL 2–1 Panathinaikos (18,493, Alcazar Stadium, 27 December 1987)

All records, counted for the Super League and former Alpha Ethniki championships.

Players

Historical squads
The 1988 Championship line-up and the 1985, 2007 Cup winning line-ups:

Current squad

Reserves squad
(Players of the youth squad under professional contract)

Other players under contract

Out on loan

Youth squad

Foreign players

International players

Notable former players

Albania
 Lefteris Milos (†)
 Blerim Kotobelli
 Erind Prifti
 Bledi Muca
 Fatjon Andoni
 Gertin Hoxhalli
 Ergys Kaçe
 Fiorin Durmishaj
 Kristian Kushta
Algeria
 Samy Frioui
 Aymen Tahar
Argentina
 Jonathan Bustos
 Gastón Casas
 Enrique Alberto Cavoli
 Guillermo Oscar Daus (†)
 Matías Degra
 Mauricio Ferrari
 Emmanuel Francou
 Daniel Roberto Gil
 Matias Iglesias
 Horacio Oscar Morales (†)
 Milton Müller
 Sebastián Nayar
 Facundo Parra
 Emanuel Perrone
 Fabricio Poci
 Daniel Ponce
 Gabriel Ramírez
 Marcelo Sarmiento
Australia
 Leon Gardikiotis
 Michael Valkanis
 Mitchell Whalley
Austria
 Sanel Kuljić
Azerbaijan
 Amit Guluzade
Belarus
 Yevgeniy Shikavka
Belgium
 Mbo Mpenza
 Roddy Kambala
 José Barroso
 Georgios Galitsios
 Ziguy Badibanga
Bolivia
 Adrián Jusino
Bosnia and Herzegovina
 Enver Hadžiabdić
 Simo Krunić
 Petar Kunić
 Adnan Šećerović
Brazil
 Césinha
 Silva Cleyton
 Delson
 Dodô
 Eliomar Silva
 Marcello Troisi
 João Leonardo
 Flávio Pinto
 Guga
 Marco de Oliveira
 Marcel Issa
 Paulo da Silva
 Piá
 Jone
 Ricardo Jesus
 Romeu
 Silva Júnior
 Vela Júnior
 Vinícius Silva
 Caio Vinicius
 Leozinho
 Bruno Chalkiadakis
Bulgaria
 Kenan Bargan
 Diyan Bozhilov
 Ivan Dangovski
 Vasil Dragolov
 Hristofor Hubchev
 Ekrem Genç
 Mariyan Gerasimov
 Gosho Petkov
 Georgi Tsingov
Burundi
 Noureddine Ndikumana
 Madjidi Ndikumana
Cameroon
 Thierry Modo Abouna
 Augustin Billa
 David Embé
 Salomon Olembé
 Jean-Pierre Fiala
 Geremi
 Serge Honi
 Jules Goda
 Benjamin Moukandjo
Croatia
 Adnan Aganović
 Slavko Bralić
 Sandi Križman
 Mateo Mužek
 Tomislav Vranjić
 Nikola Žižić
Cyprus
 Andreas Avraam
 Nektarios Alexandrou
 Stathis Aloneftis
 Ioannis Kosti
 Antonis Makris
Czech Republic
 Jan Blažek
 Rudolf Skácel
DR Congo
 Kanieba Malouma
 Ricky Lokela
 Joël Tshibamba
 Déo Kanda
Egypt
 Ali Ghazal
 Basem Morsy
 Amr Warda
England
 Michalis Banias
Estonia
 Sander Puri
Finland
 Tim Sparv
France
 Christian Bassila
 Alexandre Coeff
 Geoffrey Dernis
 David Fleurival
 Cyril Kali
 Ibrahim Keita
 Yohann Lasimant
 Dany N'Guessan
 Fabrice Pancrate
 Laurent Robert
 Steven Thicot

Gabon
 Henry Antchouet
 Daniel Cousin
Georgia 
 Gennadios Xenodochof
Germany
 Marco Förster
 Giorgos S. Georgiadis
 Giannis Chloros
 Christian Weber
 Christos Agrodimos
 Antonis Kablionis
 Manuel Stiefler
Ghana
 Mohammed Abubakari
 Owusu-Ansah Kontor
Greece
 Giorgos Abaris
 Giorgos Agorogiannis
 Alexis Alexandris
 Ilias Anastasakos
 Nikos Anastasopoulos
 Panagiotis Bahramis (†)
 Manolis Bertos
 Stathis Chaitas
 Spyros Christopoulos
 Nikos Dabizas
 Giorgos Delizisis
 Angelos Digozis
 Giorgos Fotakis
 Giannis Galitsios
 Fanis Gekas
 Evripidis Giakos
 Stelios Giannakopoulos
 Christos Kalantzis
 Vaggelis Kaounos
 Nikos Karanikas
 Vassilis Karapialis
 Paschalis Kassos
 Panagiotis Katsiaros
 Nikos Kehagias
 Fotis Kipouros
 Dimitris Kolovetsios
 Kostas Kolomitrousis
 Dimitris Komesidis
 Dimitris Kontodimos
 Ilias Kotsios
 Stefanos Kotsolis
 Dimitris Koukoulitsios (†)
 Giorgos Kousas
 Vasilios Koutsianikoulis
 Thomas Kyparissis
 Ilias Kyriakidis
 Tasos Kyriakos
 Andreas Labropoulos
 Tasos Lagos
 Manolis Liapakis
 Kostas Maloumidis
 Mattheos Maroukakis
 Paschalis Melissas
 Christos Melissis
 Alexios Michail
 Christos Michail
 Chrisostomos Michailidis
 Giorgos Mitsibonas(†)
 Manolis Moniakis
 Dimitris Mousiaris (†)
 Vangelis Nastos
 Thomas Nazlidis
 Kostas Nebegleras
 Sakis Paleologos
 Theologis Papadopoulos
 Thanasis Papazoglou
 Takis Parafestas
 Nikos Patsiavouras
 Dimitris Pinakas
 Vangelis Platellas
 Giorgos Plitsis
 Manolis Psomas
 Vasilios Rentzas
 Giorgos Saitiotis
 Dimitris Salpingidis
 Achilleas Sarakatsanos
 Savvas Siatravanis
 Stathis Tavlaridis
 Thanasis Tsigas
 Sakis Tsiolis
 Giannis Valaoras
 Spyros Vallas
 Tasos Venetis
 Stelios Venetidis
 Angelos Vertzos
 Thodoris Voutiritsas
 Michalis Ziogas
 Petros Zouroudis
Guinea
 Pato
Honduras
 Diego Reyes
Hungary
 Gergely Nagy
Iceland
 Ögmundur Kristinsson
Iran
 Gholamhossein Hashempour
Ireland
 Paul Bannon (†)
Israel
 Shimon Abuhatzira
 Salim Tuama
Ivory Coast
 Jean Luc Assoubre
 Ibrahima Bakayoko
 Franck Guela
Kenya
 Aboud Omar
Kosovo
 Suad Sahiti
Latvia
 Jānis Ikaunieks
Moldova
 Dinu Graur
Mexico
 Antonio de Nigris (†)
Moldova
 Dinu Graur
Morocco
 Naïm Aarab
Montenegro
 Mladen Božović
 Žarko Dragaš
 Goran Perišić
 Denis Tonković
Netherlands
 James Efmorfidis
 North Macedonia
 Davor Taleski
 Nikola Jakimovski

Nigeria
 Stephen Makinwa
 Abiola Dauda
 Henry Okorocha
Peru
 Nolberto Solano
Poland
 Krzysztof Adamczyk
 Patryk Aleksandrowicz
 Krzysztof Baran
 Józef Dankowski
 Dawid Jarka
 Jan Karaś
 Jacek Kacprzak
 Kazimierz Kmiecik
 Janusz Kupcewicz
 Arkadiusz Malarz
 Dariusz Marzec
 Blazej Jankowski
 Jaroslaw Kasperczak
 Maciej Żurawski
Portugal
 Filipe da Costa
 Hélder
 Luís Boa Morte
 Serginho
 Zequinha
Romania
 Giannis Matzourakis
 Gabriel Torje
 Dennis Şerban
 Ştefan Stoica
 Steliano Filip
Senegal
 Ibrahim Tall
Serbia
 Siniša Babić
 Vladimir Bajić
 Milan Bojović
 Uroš Ćosić
 Miloš Deletić
 Miloš Filipović
 Aleksandar Gojković
 Nikola Grubješić
 Saša Ilić
 Velimir Ivanović
 Boki Jovanović
 Marko Jovanović
 Dragan Knežević
 Nemanja Mladenović
 Slobodan Miletić
 Radomir Milosavljević
 Svetozar Marković
 Ivan Nedeljković
 Dejan Radojković
 Borivoje Ristić
 Risto Ristović
 Zoran Riznić
 Aleksandar Simić
 Sladjan Spasić
 Nikola Stanković
 Thanasis Stojnović
 Denis Tonković
 Nikola Trujić
 Stefan Živković
Slovakia
 Kamil Čontofalský
 Pavol Farkaš
 Igor Klejch
 Ján Kozák
 Jozef Kožlej
 Ján Lazorík
Slovenia
 Marko Nunić
 Janez Pate
 Aleksandar Radosavljevič
 Dino Seremet
 Mirnes Šišić
South Africa
 Lehlogonolo Masalesa
Spain
 Pablo Gállego
 José Antonio Espín
 Toni González
 Toni Muñoz
 Ximo Navarro
 Ximo Forner
 Perico
 Jorge Pina
 Piti
 Alejandro Chacopino
 Juan Velasco
 David Verdú
 David Mainz
 Noé Acosta
Sweden
 Mikael Rönnberg
 Ivo Vazgeč
Tunisia
 Hamza Younés
 Änis Ben-Hatira
Turkey
 Tümer Metin
Ukraine
 Viktor Dvirnyk
Uruguay
 Mathías Acuña
 Fabián Canobbio
 Alexander Castillo
 Adrián Colombino
 Nico Varela
 Sebastian Viera
Venezuela
 Pol Hurtado

Managerial history

  Aleksandar Petrović (1 July 1964 – 30 June 1965)
  Dionysis Minardos (1 July 1965 – 30 June 1966)
  Alexandros Vogas (1 July 1966 – 30 June 1967)
  Giourkas Seitaridis (1 July 1967 – 30 June 1968)
  Lefteris Papadakis (1 July 1968 – 1969)
  Theodoros Sirganis (1969)
  Giannis Helmis (1969)
  Theodoros Sirganis (1969–70)
  Apostolos Chabibis (1970)
  Christos Kletsas (1970)
  Kostas Ziogas (1970)
  Giorgos Tsalopoulos (1970)
  Kostas Polychroniou (1970 – 30 June 1972)
  Stevan Karanfilović (1 July 1972 – 30 June 1973)
  Ivan Kochev (1 July 1973 – 30 June 1974)
  Dan Georgiadis (1 July 1974 – 1975)
  Ivan Kochev (1975)
  Lakis Progios (1975)
  Horacio Morales (†) (1975)
  Nikos Alefantos (1975)
  Horacio Morales (†) (1975–76)
  Giorgos Petridis (1976)
  Giorgos Tsalopoulos (1976)
  Antonis Georgiadis (1976–77)
  Vangelis Balopoulos (1977)
  Pavlos Grigoriadis (1977)
  Giannis Zafiropoulos (1977 – 30 June 1978)
  Milan Ribar (1 July 1978 – 30 June 1979)
  Kostas Polychroniou (1 July 1979 – 30 June 1980)
  Antonis Georgiadis (1 July 1980 – 30 June 1982)
  Jacek Gmoch (1 July 1982 – 30 June 1983)
  Walter Skocik (1 July 1983 – 30 June 1984)
  Andrzej Strejlau (1 July 1984 – 31 March 1986)
   Nikolaos Tsiakos (1 April 1986 – 30 June 1986)
  Jacek Gmoch (1 July 1986 – 2 May 1988)
  Horacio Morales (†) (3 May 1988 – 30 June 1988)
  Vladimír Táborský (1 July 1988 – 30 June 1989)
  Marcin Bochynek (1 July 1989 – 18 October 1990)
  Nikos Alefantos (25 October 1990 – 3 December 1990)
  Hristo Bonev (6 December 1990 – 30 June 1993)
  Jacek Gmoch (1 July 1993 – 1 November 1993)
  Sotiris Koukouthakis (2 November 1993 – 8 November 1993)
  Christos Archontidis (9 November 1993 – 30 June 1994)
  Vassilis Daniil (1 July 1994 – 30 June 1995)
  Ioannis Matzourakis (1 July 1995 – 5 October 1995)
  Kostas Siavalas &  Leonidas Efstathiou (6 October 1995 – 17 October 1995)
  Andreas Michalopoulos (18 October 1995 – 30 June 1996)
  Giorgos Foiros (1 July 1996 – 27 January 1997)
  Kostas Siavalas &  Dimitris Simeonidis (28 January 1997 – 13 February 1997)
  Christos Archontidis (14 February 1997 – 3 March 1997)
  Kostas Siavalas &  Dimitris Simeonidis (4 March 1997 – 30 June 1997)
  Kazimierz Kmiecik (1 July 1997 – 10 November 1997)
  Zoran Babović (13 November 1997 – 21 December 1998)
  Nikos Argyroulis (24 December 1998 – 26 April 1999)
  Paris Meintanis (27 April 1999 – 11 May 1999)
  Leonidas Efstathiou (12 May 1999 – 30 June 1999)
  Stavros Diamantopoulos (1 July 1999 – 29 August 1999)
  Nebojša Ličanin (30 August 1999 – 7 February 2000)
  Takis Parafestas (8 February 2000 – 30 June 2000)
  Nikos Argyroulis (1 July 2000 – 26 November 2000)
  Giannis Alexoulis (27 November 2000 – 12 February 2001)
  Michalis Ziogas (13 February 2001 – 30 June 2001)
  Vangelis Vouroukos (1 July 2001 – 7 March 2002)
  Kostas Siavalas (8 March 2002 – 30 June 2002)
  Takis Sourlatzis (1 July 2002 – 8 September 2002)
  Christos Gkatas (9 September 2002 – 23 February 2003)
  Horacio Morales (†) (24 February 2003 – 31 March 2003)
  Takis Parafestas (1 April 2003 – 30 June 2004)
  Giorgos Donis (1 July 2004 – 24 April 2008)
  Marinos Ouzounidis (1 July 2008 – 22 February 2010)
  Giannis Papakostas (23 February 2010 – 29 November 2010)
  Kostas Katsaras (caretaker) (30 November 2010 – 16 December 2010)
  Jørn Andersen (17 December 2010 – 9 January 2011)
  Nikos Kostenoglou (10 January 2011 – 30 June 2011)
  Chris Coleman (1 July 2011 – 9 January 2012)
  Nikos Kotsovos (caretaker) (10 January 2012 – 16 January 2012)
  Božidar Bandović (17 January 2012 – 30 January 2012)
  Nikos Kehagias (31 January 2012 – 20 March 2012)
  Michalis Ziogas (21 March 2012 – 8 January 2013)
  Timos Kavakas (9 January 2013 – 30 June 2013)
  Kostas Panagopoulos (12 August 2013 – 10 November 2013)
  Giorgos Strantzalis (12 November 2013 – 8 March 2014)
  Panagiotis Tzanavaras (9 March 2014 – 30 June 2014)
  Alekos Vosniadis (1 July 2014 – 5 September 2014)
  Kostas Panagopoulos (6 September 2014 – 1 November 2014)
  Thomas Grafas (2 November 2014 – 23 December 2014)
  Sakis Anastasiadis (caretaker) (24 December 2014 – 5 January 2015)
  Panagiotis Tzanavaras (6 January 2015 – 7 March 2015)
  Soulis Papadopoulos (8 March 2015 – 30 June 2015)
  Ratko Dostanić (10 July 2015 – 22 February 2016)
  Sakis Tsiolis (23 February 2016 – 2 June 2016)
  Angelos Anastasiadis (8 June 2016 – 31 October 2016)
  Sakis Tsiolis (1 November 2016 – 21 March 2017)
  Thodoris Voutiritsas (caretaker) (22 March 2017 – 2 April 2017)
  André Paus (3 April 2017 – 12 September 2017)
  Jacky Mathijssen (14 September 2017 – 25 September 2017)
  Ilias Fyntanis (26 September 2017 – 19 February 2018)
  Ratko Dostanić (20 February 2018 – 10 March 2018)
  Sotiris Antoniou (12 March 2018 – 22 September 2018)
  Gianluca Festa (24 September 2018 – 30 June 2019)
  Gordan Petrić (1 July 2019 – 8 August 2019)
  Michalis Grigoriou (9 August 2019 – 22 November 2020)
  Giannis Tatsis (23 November 2020 – 20 January 2021)
  Gianluca Festa (21 January 2021 – 9 May 2021)
  Michalis Ziogas (caretaker) (10 May 2021 – 23 May 2021)
  Kostas Frantzeskos (24 May 2021 – 13 October 2021)
  Ilias Fyntanis (14 October 2021 – 22 December 2021)
  Panagiotis Goutsidis (23 December 2021 – 28 April 2022)
  Sotiris Antoniou (3 May 2022 – 18 July 2022)
  Panagiotis Goutsidis (18 July 2022 – 23 December 2022)
  Giannis Taousianis (23 December 2022 – 14 March 2023)
  Panagiotis Goutsidis (14 March 2023 - present)

Competition history

European competitions

UEFA Champions League all-time club ranking 
As of 26 May 2021

League and cup history
As of May 2022

Key: 1R = First Round, 2R = Second Round, 3R = Third Round, 4R = Fourth Round, 5R = Fifth Round, 6R = Sixth Round, GS = Group Stage, QF = Quarter-finals, SF = Semi-finals, RU = Runner-up, W = Winner.
Point system: 1959–60 to 1972–73: 3–2–1. 1973–74 to 1991–92: 2–1–0. 1992–93 onwards: 3–1–0.
In the season 2012–13 the team gained 63 points but was penalized due to financial problems (−18 points in the final table) and finished 13th.

League total 
As of May 2022

European competitions
As of July 2009

Club staff

Presidents
At the founding of the club and under the administration of a 15-member council, composed of club representatives and organizations of the city, Konstantinos Tzovaridis was appointed as the first president. The current president, Achilleas Ntavelis, is AEL's 31st president with several presidents having multiple spells in office (counted separately.)

Kit manufacturers and sponsorship

Current sponsorships
Main Shirt Sponsor: ANIMUS Medical Group
Back Shirt Sponsor: Formedia.gr
Shorts Sponsor: GTC ΛΕΥΚΑΔΙΤΗΣ RAIDER
Official Sport Clothing Manufacturer: Acerbis
Great Sponsor:

References

External links

Official websites
Official website 
AEL at Super League 
AEL at UEFA
AEL at FIFA
News sites
 AEL on aelole.gr 
 AEL news from ArenaLarissa 
Media
AEL on Facebook
AEL on YouTube

 
Football clubs in Thessaly
Association football clubs established in 1964
1964 establishments in Greece
Super League Greece 2 clubs